The following is a list of the 39 municipalities (comuni) of the Province of Arezzo, Tuscany, Italy.

List

See also 
List of municipalities of Italy

References 

Arezzo